Supermax is a Brazilian television series produced by Rede Globo that debuted on September 20, 2016 with an expected total of 12 episodes to be aired. The show was created by José Alvarenga Jr., Marcal Aquino and Fernando Bonassi. The latter two also wrote the script alongside Carolina Kotscho, Braulio Mantovani, Dennison Ramalho, Juliana Rojas, Raphael Draccon and Rafael Montes while José Eduardo Belmonte, Rafael Miranda and Alvarenga helm the directing team.

In 2017, the series was nominated for the Seoul International Drama Awards in Best Series and Best Author Categories.

Production 
The writing process of the series took place in the writer's room format in which the writers come together intensively for the creation and development of scripts. According to Carolina Kotscho, they had considerable freedom in writing: "we wrote without any limit. We imagined that eventually this limit would come, but it didn't. This was a grateful surprise!" According to Raphael Montes, one of the writers, Globo gave total freedom to the staff: "I remember a discussion in which we started to throw ideas and we said that this would never be aired, but they did film it! It was our will, the creation's, the direction's, the team's and Globo's itself to make something different, that has known and identifiable elements by the general public but at the same time innovating."

The creator and director José Alvarenga defined the series as a crossing of various genres; ranging from police thriller, horror, terror and suspense to romance. The series was inspired from the first season of True Detective, as well as other similar themed shows such as The Walking Dead, American Horror Story, Supernatural, The Hunger Games and Lost. To simulate the feel of a reality show as the plot demands, Alvarenga borrowed nine camera operators from Big Brother Brazil.  The fictional 800 m² prison set, built in Estúdios Globo, was inspired from Alcatraz Prison.

The casting aimed for names unknown to the general public. It also had a unique isolating element compared to other studios of Globo Studios, to keep those involved in the tense and sombre mood of the plot. It involved the knowledge of how to react to different scenes, like amputating a leg in cold blood, being strangled or finding an aberration, an unusual experience for Brazilian actors who were more used to drama and melodrama. Denisson Ramalho, a writer who specialises in horror movies, had said that "it is the most 'from hell' Brazilian TV series of all time".

Release 
The series was expected to be released on October 2, 2015 after the end of Verdades Secretas. The series had its debut postponed to 2016 due to the advertising market being in a bad economic time.

International version 
An international version for Hispanic channels is also expected to be produced in Spanish, with Argentine filmmaker Daniel Burman as the director and Bruno Gagliasso starring as a transgender character.

Plot 
Mixing fiction and reality, the series chronicles the journey of 12 participants (7 men and 5 women) in a reality show taking place at a disabled maximum security prison located in the Amazon rain forest. Each participant are not chosen by chance but have one thing in common: each of them committed a serious crime.

All goes well on the first day of confinement until the production team disappears, leaving them to their own devices, with macabre and supernatural events occurring within the prison. Only one of them will win the prize of R$2 million, but they will have to leave the place alive.

Episodes

Cast

Main Cast

Mariana Ximenes as Bruna, a nurse fired from a hospital where she used to take care of terminal patients.
 Erom Cordeiro as Sérgio, a police captain suspended for a crime he says he didn't commit.
Cléo Pires as Sabrina Toledo, a psychologist who was once kidnapped and spent a few months in captivity.
Bruno Belarmino as Luisão, a former MMA fighter that is constantly affected by a recurring guilt and spends time trying to control his anger and violence.
Nicolas Trevijano as Father Nando, who dedicated most of his life to the Church, and considers his suspension unfair.
Maria Clara Spinelli as Janette, owner of a chain of beauty salons who had a miserable childhood with her alcoholic and violent father.
Ravel Andrade as Dante, the youngest participant and an enthusiast for obscure cults.
Rui Ricardo Dias as Artur, a former football player who still believes to be active.
Fabiana Gugli as Diana, a housewife who recently lost her husband.
Mário César Camargo as Dr. Timóteo, a reformed Army physician.
Vânia de Brito as Cecília Damasceno, a woman that reached Rio de Janeiro's elite, but is now close to misery following the death of her husband and son.
Ademir Emboava as José Augusto, an economist linked to politicians who acted as a fund raiser for a political party.
Márcio Fecher as Nonato/Baal, one of the people who worked at the construction of the prison. He used to be a pastor, but now lives underneath the prison with several other women.

Guest Stars
Pedro Bial as himself.

Awards and nominations 
 2016 Troféu APCA - Nominated for Best Series and Best Director.
 2016 Prêmio Extra de Televisão - Nominated for Best Series.
 2017 Seoul International Drama Awards - Nominated Best Series and Best Author Categories.
 2018 Platino Awards - Best Actress in a Series for Mariana Ximenes (Pending)
 2018 Platino Awards - Best Series Actor for Erom Cordeiro (Pending)

Notes

References

External links 

 

Brazilian television series
2016 Brazilian television series debuts
2010s television miniseries
Rede Globo original programming
Brazilian television miniseries
Brazilian action television series
Brazilian mystery television series
Brazilian thriller television series
Portuguese-language television shows
2010s Brazilian television series